The men's 400 metre individual medley competition of the swimming events at the 1987 Pan American Games took place on 10 August at the Indiana University Natatorium. The last Pan American Games champion was Ricardo Prado of Brazil.

This race consisted of eight lengths of the pool. The first two lengths were swum using the butterfly stroke, the second pair with the backstroke, the third pair of lengths in breaststroke, and the final two were freestyle.

Results
All times are in minutes and seconds.

Heats

Final 
The final was held on August 10.

References

Swimming at the 1987 Pan American Games